The FC Porto Museum, officially known as FC Porto Museum by BMG for sponsorship reasons, is a museum located in Porto, dedicated to the history of the Portuguese association football club FC Porto. It was inaugurated on 28 September 2013, on occasion of the club's 120th anniversary, and opened its doors to the general public on 26 October.

Conceived and constructed by Sibina Partners (Barcelona) and MUSE (London),  the museum occupies an area of almost  under the east stand of the Estádio do Dragão. It contains 27 thematic areas with a strong interactive and technologic component, which showcase the club's historical events, matches, titles, managers and players, not only in football but in other sections, including handball, basketball and roller hockey.  The central and dominant space features the club's large collection of domestic football silverware as well as its seven international trophies.

The museum also includes an auditorium, a club store, a coffeehouse, and spaces for educational services and temporary exhibitions. The Valquíria Dragão (Dragon Valkyrie), an exclusive work by Portuguese artist Joana Vasconcelos, which incorporates club textiles and trophies, welcomes visitors at the museum's entrance.

References

External links 

Museum
Association football museums and halls of fame
Sports museums in Portugal
Museums in Porto
Museums established in 2013
Museum
Sport in Porto